Güero may refer to:

People
 El Güero Gil (d. 1999), nickname for Alfredo Gil, Mexican guitarist/vocalist, co-founder of trio Los Panchos and inventor of the Requinto guitar
 El Güero Jaibo (d. 1993), aka Juan Francisco Murillo Díaz, a member of the Tijuana Cartel
 El Güero Loco, one of the many aliases of Ivan Martin, a member of the Chicano Hip-hop group, Delinquent Habits.
 El Güero Palma, nickname for Héctor Luis Palma Salazar, a Mexican drug trafficker

Arts, entertainment, and media
 Guero (book) ("Later"), a 1643 Basque-language book by Pedro Agerre
Guero Davila, a character in Queen of the South

Films
El Güero Estrada (1997), Mexican film directed by Gilberto De Anda and scored by Gustavo Ramírez Reyes
Güeros (2014), Mexican film directed by Alonso Ruizpalacios

Music
Guero (1970), a piano study by German composer Helmut Lachenmann
Guero (2005), an album by Beck
Guerolito (2005), a remix album by Beck, featuring all of the songs from Guero except for the hidden track, "Send a Message to Her"
Matando Gueros (1993), an album by the Mexican metal-band Brujeria